Jan Čarek (29 December 1898, in Heřmaň, Austria-Hungary, now Czech Republic – 27 March 1966, in Prague, Czechoslovakia) was a Czechoslovak poet, essayist, and literary critic. He was greatly popular in his day for his children's books a "rural" poetry.

Biography 
From 1910 to 1918 he studied at the gymnasium in Písek. He was initially working as a railway clerk. Since 1946 he started his professional writer career.

Since the 1920s he regularly published his works in a number of Czech literary magazines. After 1948 he devoted himself almost exclusively to children's literature.

Works 
Vojna, 1920
Chudá rodina z Heřmaně, 1924
Temno v chalupách, 1926
Smutný život, 1929
Tři baldy o válce, 1934
Hvězdy na nebi, 1934
Balada o Kýrovi, 1934
Všechny chalupy,. 1936
Tváří k vesnici, 1938
Svatozář, 1939
Devítiocasá kočka, 1936
Básně rolníků, 1939
Temno v chalupách, 1941
O životě a literatuře, 1941
Maminka, 1941
V zemi české, 1942
Na špičku nože, 1943
Železná panna, 1946
Mezi dvěma ohni, 1947
Dopis na věčnost, 1947
Ráj domova, 1948
Jan Opolský, 1949
Heřmaň, 1952
Zvířátka – naši přátelé, 1953
Zlatý dětský věk, 1953
Bajky o nástrojích, 1953
Radost nad radost, 1954
Náš jeden rok, 1954
Máš rád stromy? 1954
Co si povídaly stroje, 1955
Ovoce, ovoce na naší zahrádce, 1957
Co zvířátka dovedou, 1957
Bylo – nebylo, 1957
Veselý věneček, 1958
Svíce potěšení, 1958
Dobrý den, zvířátka, 1958
Od jehly k mašinkám, 1960
Kreslíme rozprávku k medvídkovej chalúpke, 1960
O veselé mašince, 1961
Na polane, na lúke, 1961
Kolo radovánek, 1961
Dve mašinky, 1961
Farby, farbičky, 1962
10 kuriatok, 1963
Políčko, pole, 1963
Nejkrásnější zvířátko, 1963
Cose to děje? 1965
Čarokruh, 1971
Motýlí čas, 1978

External links
 citarny.cz  

1898 births
1966 deaths
Czechoslovak poets